Zhiwei Xia is a Chinese paralympic athlete. He participated at the 2016 Summer Paralympics in the athletics competition, being awarded the bronze medal in the men's shot put event on F41 class.

References

External links 
Paralympic Games profile

Living people
Place of birth missing (living people)
Year of birth missing (living people)
Chinese male shot putters
Athletes (track and field) at the 2016 Summer Paralympics
Medalists at the 2016 Summer Paralympics
Paralympic medalists in athletics (track and field)
Paralympic athletes of China
Paralympic bronze medalists for China
21st-century Chinese people